The SA Suns (formerly Southern Suns - prior to 2015)  are a women's field hockey team based in South Australia that competes in the Australian Hockey League (AHL).
The SA Suns won national championships in 1995 and 2011.

Current Team
The following is the SA Suns team roster for the 2018 AHL:

Head coaches: Mark Dedman

Mariana Lagos
Jane Claxton (C)
Celeste Foord
Emily Grist
Holly Evans
Euleena MacLachlan
Amy Hunt
Alison Penington
Michaela Spano
Karri McMahon (C)
Ashleigh Morrison
Lucy Talbot
Leah Welstead
Amy Hammond (GK)
Hattie Shand
Ashlee Wells (GK)

History

Name Changes
Since the founding of the Women's Australian Hockey League, the SA Suns have competed under five different names.

National Championships

2011 Women's Australian Hockey League
At the 2011 AHL, the SA Suns won the Australian Hockey League for the second time.

This was the first time the SA Suns had won in 16 years, defeating the NSW Arrows 1–0 in the final.

The SA Suns lineup included Hockeyroo members Holly Evans, Bianca Greenshields, Georgie Parker and Elise Stacy. The team was also aided by New Zealand imports Melody Cooper, Clarissa Eshuis and Kayla Sharland. The team was coached by former Kookaburra, Craig Victory.

The team concluded the tournament with 7 wins, 2 draws and 2 losses, scoring 29 goals and conceding 14.

1995 Women's Australian Hockey League
The SA Suns won their maiden Australian Hockey League title in 1995.

The team included 1992 Olympians and Hockeyroo members, Juliet Haslam OAM, Kate Allen OAM and Alison Peek OAM.

1984 Olympian Tricia Heberle was head coach of the team.

Previous Placings
The following table shows the SA Suns' final placings at the AHL since its founding.

Notable players
Notable players who have played for the SA Suns include:

 Kate Allen
 Jane Claxton
 Melody Cooper
 Clarissa Eshuis (NZL)
 Holly Evans
 Juliet Haslam
 Bianca Joyce
 Mariana Lagos (CHL)
 Karri McMahon
 Gabrielle Nance
 Georgie Parker
 Alison Peek
 Kayla Sharland (NZL)
 Michaela Spano
 Lucy Talbot

Coaches
Previous Head Coaches of the SA Suns have been:
 Mark Dedman (2016–present)
 Darren Neimke (2014-2016)
 Craig Victory (2011)
 Tricia Heberle (1993–1995)

Home Stadium
The team's home stadium is the State Hockey Centre (South Australia) (also known as the Pines Stadium) which is located north of the Adelaide CBD in Gepps Cross. The stadium has a capacity of about 4,000 with 330 permanent seats. The stadium was used for the 1997 Men's Hockey Champions Trophy.

Honour Roll

References

Australian field hockey clubs
Sports teams in South Australia
Women's field hockey teams in Australia
Sporting clubs in Adelaide
Field hockey clubs established in 1993